Damond Earl Smith II (born July 8, 1991) is an American football defensive back He played college football at the University of South Alabama and attended Inkster High School in Inkster, Michigan. Smith has also been a member of the Kansas City Chiefs, Arizona Cardinals, Sioux Falls Storm, and Tampa Bay Storm.

Early life
Smith attended Inkster High School where he played American football.

College career
Smith played for the Western Michigan Broncos from 2009 to 2010. He played in 18 games over two years and helped the Broncos to 11 wins. He transferred to South Alabama where he played from 2011 to 2012. He was the team's starter his final two years and helped the Jaguars to 8 wins. He played in 4 games during his career. Smith was suspended after just 4 games for a violation of team and departmental rules.

Professional career

BC Lions
In October 2013, Smith signed with the BC Lions.

Kansas City Chiefs
On July 28, 2014, Smith signed with the Kansas City Chiefs. On August 26, 2014, Smith was released by the Chiefs.

Arizona Cardinals
In February 2015, Smith signed with the Arizona Cardinals. On August 4, 2015, Smith was cut by the Cardinals.

References

External links
 South Alabama Jaguars bio

Living people
1991 births
Players of American football from Michigan
American football defensive backs
Canadian football defensive backs
American players of Canadian football
Western Michigan Broncos football players
South Alabama Jaguars football players
BC Lions players
Kansas City Chiefs players
Arizona Cardinals players
Salt Lake Screaming Eagles players
Iowa Barnstormers players
Tampa Bay Storm players
Arizona Rattlers players
Cleveland Gladiators players
Maine Mammoths players
Sioux Falls Storm players